The 1969 New Zealand Grand Prix was a race held at the Pukekohe Park Raceway on 4 January 1969.  The race had 20 starters.

It was the 16th New Zealand Grand Prix, and doubled as the opening round of the 1969 Tasman Series.  Chris Amon won his second NZGP, leading home Austrian star Jochen Rindt.

Classification 
Results as follows:

References

New Zealand Grand Prix
Grand Prix
Tasman Series
New Zealand